The sambuca (also sambute, sambiut, sambue, sambuque, or sambuke) was an ancient stringed instrument of Asiatic origin. The term sambuca is also applied to a number of other instruments.

Original

Eusebius wrote that the Troglodytae invented the sambuca, while Athenaeus wrote that the writer Semus of Delos said that the first person who used the sambuca was Sibylla, and that the instrument derives its name from a man named Sambyx who invented it.
Athenaeus also wrote that Euphorion in his book on the Isthmian Games mentioned that Troglodytae used sambuca with four strings like the Parthians. He also add that the Magadis was an ancient instrument, but that in latter times it was altered, and had the name also changed to that of the sambuca.

The sambuca has been compared to the siege engine of the same name by some classical writers; Polybius likens it to a rope ladder; others describe it as boat-shaped. Among the musical instruments known, the Egyptian enanga best answers to these descriptions, which are doubtless responsible for the medieval
drawings representing the sambuca as a kind of tambourine, for Isidore of Seville elsewhere defines the symphonia as a tambourine.

The  is mentioned in the Bible ( verses 5 to 15). In the King James Bible it is erroneously translated as "sackbut".

Other Instruments

During the Middle Ages the word "sambuca" was applied to:
 a stringed instrument, about which little can be discovered
 a hurdy-gurdy, a hand-cranked stringed musical instrument from the Middle Ages, sometimes called a sambuca or sambuca rotata
 a wind instrument made from the wood of the elder tree (sambūcus).

Isidore of Seville describes it in his Etymologiae as:

 
In a glossary by Papias of Lombardy (c. 1053), first printed at Milan in 1476, the sambuca is described as a cithara, which in that century was generally glossed "harp":

In Tristan und Isolde (bars 7563-72) when the knight is enumerating to King Marke all the instruments upon which he can play, the sambiut is the last mentioned:

A Latin–French glossary has the equivalence Psalterium = . During the later Middle Ages  was often translated "sackbut" in the vocabularies, whether merely from the phonetic similarity of the two words has not yet been established.

The great Boulogne Psalter (11th Century) contains many fanciful instruments which are evidently intended to illustrate the equally vague and fanciful descriptions of instruments in the apocryphal letter of Saint Jerome,  ("to Dardanus"). In the 19th Century it was reproduced by Edmond de Coussemaker, Charles de la Croix and Eugène Emmanuel Viollet-le-Duc, and has given rise to endless discussions without leading to any satisfactory solution.

Fabio Colonna created the pentecontachordon, a keyboard instrument which he called a sambuca.

References

Attribution

Lost and extinct musical instruments
String instruments